Aethycteron is a genus of monogeneans belonging to the family Ancyrocephalidae. 
All members of the genus are parasitic on fish.

Species
The following species are considered valid according to WorRMS: 

 Aethycteron ammocryptus (Harrises & Vickery, 1970) Suriano & Beverly-Burton, 1982
 Aethycteron caerulei Suriano & Beverley-Burton, 1982
 Aethycteron chlorosomus (Harrises & Vickery, 1970) Suriano & Beverly-Burton, 1982
 Aethycteron lottensis (Harrises & Vickery, 1970) Suriano & Beverly-Burton, 1982
 Aethycteron malleus (Mueller, 1938) Suriano & Beverly-Burton, 1982
 Aethycteron micropercae Suriano & Beverly-Burton, 1982
 Aethycteron moorei (Mizelle, 1940) Suriano & Beverley-Burton, 1982
 Aethycteron nigrei Suriano & Beverly-Burton, 1982
 Aethycteron nigrofasciatus (Harrises, 1962) Suriano & Beverly-Burton, 1982
 Aethycteron robisoni Cloutman & McAllister, 2017 
 Aethycteron stigmaeus (Harrises & Vickery, 1970) Suriano & Beverly-Burton, 1982

References

Ancyrocephalidae
Monogenea genera